Goryachevodsky is an urban locality (a settlement) under the administrative jurisdiction of the city of krai significance of Pyatigorsk in Stavropol Krai, Russia, located at the confluence of the Podkumok and Yutsa Rivers. Population:  As of the 2010 Census, it was the most populous urban locality in Russia not having a town status.

References

Urban-type settlements in Stavropol Krai